The Holman Christian Standard Bible (HCSB) is a modern English Bible translation from Holman Bible Publishers. The New Testament was published in 1999, followed by the full Bible in March 2004.

Beginnings 
The roots of the HCSB can be traced to 1984, when Arthur Farstad, general editor of the New King James Version of the Bible, began a new translation project.  In 1998, Farstad and LifeWay Christian Resources (the publishing arm of the Southern Baptist Convention) came to an agreement that would allow LifeWay to fund and publish the completed work. Farstad died soon after, and leadership of the editorial team was turned over to Dr. Edwin Blum, who had been an integral part of the team. The death of Farstad resulted in a change to the Koine Greek source text underlying the HCSB, although Farstad had envisioned basing the new translation on the same texts used for the King James Version and New King James Version. He followed the Greek Majority Text which he and Zane C. Hodges had authored. After Farstad's death, the editorial team replaced this text with the consensus Greek New Testament established by twentieth-century scholars.

Translation philosophy

Holman Bible Publishers assembled an international, interdenominational team of 100 scholars and proofreaders, all of whom were committed to biblical inerrancy.

Formats
The HCSB is available in electronic form for WORDsearch and Bible Explorer software.  An HCSB Study Bible became available in October 2010. The HCSB is available online. It is marketed in Christian publications as an apologetics Bible and has a version specifically for the Microsoft Xbox 360 called Bible Navigator X.

Updates 
The 2nd edition HCSB appeared in 2010. The most significant change was the expanded use of the covenant name of God, known as the tetragrammaton,  rendered as "Yahweh," rather than the traditional English "." In the first edition Yahweh was found in 78 places; the update increased that to 495 instances (the tetragrammaton appears in over 6,800 places in the Old Testament).

In June 2016 B&H Publishing announced a revision of the translation called the Christian Standard Bible (CSB).

Comparison of Psalm 83:18
HCSB:

CSB:

Notes

References

Further reading
Perry, John. (May 7, 1999) "Broadman & Holman Publishers announces new Bible translation". Retrieved March 14, 2005.
Walker, Ken. (July 20, 2001) "Holman Christian Standard Bible New Testament now available". Retrieved March 14, 2005.
Dewey, David, 2004. A User's Guide to Bible Translations (Downers Grove, IL: Intervarsity Press, 2004). .

External links
 HCSB Official website (Archive) (the HCSB website now redirects to the CSB website)

2004 books
Bible translations into English
2004 in Christianity
Southern Baptist Convention